Luis Berbari (born October 5, 1972) is a retired American soccer player.

Career
Berbari played four years of collegiate soccer at CSU Bakersfield before turning professional. Berbari began his professional career with Central California Valley Hydra of the USISL.  He played in the 1994 and 1995 seasons for the Stockton, California-based professional team.  During the off-season, Berbari trained with FC Zwolle (now PEC Zwolle) and SC Cambuur of the Dutch 2nd Division as well as with NK Zadar of the Croatian First Division.

At the age of 23, he became the first American Citizen to play in Ukraine when he signed with Ukrainian First League side FC Vorskla Poltava for the 1995–96 season, and helped the team gain promotion to the Ukrainian Premier League after finishing in first place. Following his spell in the Ukraine, Berbari joined and captained the Nashville Metros for the 1997 A-League season.  Berbari returned to Europe for the 1998-1999 season when he signed with German Oberliga club SV Darmstadt 98 helping them finish at the top of the table and gaining promotion to the Regionalliga.

References

External links
 

1972 births
Living people
American soccer players
American expatriate soccer players
Expatriate footballers in Ukraine
American expatriate sportspeople in Ukraine
FC Vorskla Poltava players
Ukrainian First League players
Nashville Metros players
A-League (1995–2004) players
Association football midfielders